The thoracic spinal nerve 9 (T9) is a spinal nerve of the thoracic segment.

It originates from the spinal column from below the thoracic vertebra 9 (T9).

References

Spinal nerves